Chandikadas Amritrao Deshmukh BR, better known as Nanaji Deshmukh (11 October 1916 – 27 February 2010), was a social reformer and politician from India. He worked in the fields of education, health, and rural self-reliance. He was posthumously awarded the Bharat Ratna, India's highest civilian award in 2019 by the Government of India. He was a leader of the Bharatiya Jana Sangh and also a member of the Rajya Sabha.

Early life 

Nanaji was born on 11 October 1916 into a Marathi-speaking Deshastha Rigvedi Brahmin family
at Kadoli, which is a small town in the Hingoli district. He worked as a vegetable seller to raise money for his education.

He went to high school in Sikar, where the Raoraja of Sikar gave him a scholarship. He studied in Birla college (Now BITS Pilani)). In the same year, he also joined the Rashtriya Swayamsevak Sangh (RSS).

Though born in Maharashtra, the fields of his activities were Rajasthan and Uttar Pradesh. The then RSS chief M. S. Golwalkar sent him to Gorakhpur (U.P) as "pracharak" (full-time functionary). He rose to be the Saha Prant Pracharak of the whole of Uttar Pradesh (which has now become the eighth prant of RSS).

RSS volunteer 

Deshmukh became inspired by Bal Gangadhar Tilak and his nationalist ideology, as well as showing an acquired interest in social service and activities. His family was in close contact with Keshav Baliram Hedgewar who was a regular visitor to Deshmukh's family. He could discern potential in Nanaji and encouraged him to attend RSS shakhas.

In 1940, after Hedgewar's death, many youngsters inspired by him joined the RSS in Maharashtra. Deshmukh was among those who joined the RSS devoting their whole life in service to the nation. He was sent to Uttar Pradesh as a Pracharak. At Agra, he met Deen Dayal Upadhyaya for the first time. Later, Deshmukh went to Gorakhpur as a pracharak to introduce Sangh ideology in the eastern UP. He had to stay in a Dharmashala but had to keep on changing Dharmashalas as no one was allowed to stay there for more than three days consecutively. Ultimately, he was given shelter by Baba Raghavdas, reportedly on condition that he would cook meals for him.

Within three years, almost 250 Sangh Shakhas commenced in and around Gorakhpur. He established India's first Saraswati Shishu Mandir at Gorakhpur in 1950.

When in 1947, the RSS decided to launch two journals (Rashtradharma and Panchjanya) as well as a newspaper, Swadesh, Shri Atal Bihari Vajpayee was assigned the responsibility of the editor and Deen Dayal Upadhyaya was made the Margdharshak with Nanaji as the managing director.

Mahatma Gandhi's assassination led to the imposition of a ban on the RSS and publication work came to a grinding halt. A different strategy was adopted keeping the ban in mind and Deshmukh was the brain behind underground publication work by the RSS those days.

Political life 

When the ban was lifted and it was decided to have a political organisation, Bharatiya Jana Sangh came into being. Deshmukh was asked by Golwalkar to take charge of Bharatiya Jana Sangh in Uttar Pradesh as its general secretary.

In Uttar Pradesh, BJS gained strength from Upadhyaya's vision, Atal Bihari Vajpayee's oratory skills and Deshmukh's organizational work and it emerged as an important player in the state politics. Deshmukh always shared good relations not only with his party colleagues but also with his opponents. Gupta, who suffered many defeats at the hands of Deshmukh, yet continued to have great respect for him and called him 'Nana Phadanvis'. His relations with Dr. Ram Manohar Lohia changed the course of Indian politics. Once he invited Lohia in BJS karaykarta sammelan where he met Upadhyaya for the first time and this association brought the BJS closer to other socialist parties in exposing the Congress and its misrule. Lohia and Deshmukh's association led to the first non-Congress coalition government in Uttar Pradesh after the 1967 state assembly election
Desmukh actively participated in Bhoodan Movement started by Vinoba Bhave.

Later, Narayan himself and Morarji Desai, who became the Prime Minister heading the Janata Party Government offered him the Cabinet portfolio of Industry, but Deshmukh spurned the overture. Deshmukh had won in the 1977 election held after revocation of the Emergency with a comfortable margin from Balrampur Lok Sabha constituency of Uttar Pradesh.

When Narayan gave the call for "Total Revolution" Deshmukh responded by giving total support to this movement. He was nominated to Rajya Sabha by the NDA Government in the year 1999 in recognition of his services to the nation.

Social work 

After retirement from active politics Deshmukh then served Deendayal Research Institute that he himself had established way back in 1969.

He did work towards the anti-poverty and minimum needs programme. Other areas of his work were agriculture and cottage industry, rural health and rural education. Deshmukh assumed chairmanship of the institute after leaving politics and devoted all his time to building up the institute. He was also instrumental in carrying out social restructuring programme in over 500 villages of both Uttar Pradesh and Madhya Pradesh states of India. He also published the journal "Manthan" (introspection) which was edited by K.R. Malkani for many years.

Deshmukh did social work in Gonda (U.P.), Balrampur and Beed (Maharashtra).

He also established Chitrakoot Gramoday Vishwavidyalaya in Chitrakoot, India's first rural University, and served as its Chancellor. Nanaji implemented the philosophy of integral humanism to improve the living standards of more than 150 villages of Bundelkhand.

Awards and recognition 

He was awarded highest civilian award Bharat Ratna in 2019 (Posthumously), and second highest civilian award Padma Vibhushan in 1999.

Death 
Deshmukh died on 27 February 2010 in the premises of Chitrakoot Gramoday Vishwavidyalaya that he established. He was unwell for some time due to geriatric problems and had refused to be taken to Delhi for treatment. He bequeathed his body to Dadhichi Dehdaan Sanstha of New Delhi which was accepted, and his body was sent to All India Institute of Medical Sciences for medical research.

See also 
Vidya Bharati
 Indian Nationalism
 Deen Dayal Upadhyaya
Vinayak Damodar Savarkar
Lal Krishna Advani
Balraj Madhok
Rashtriya Swayamsevak Sangh

References

External links 

 Official biographical sketch in Parliament of India website
 Bharatiya Janata Party 
 Government of India award citation
 Deendayal Research Institute 

1916 births
2010 deaths
Recipients of the Padma Vibhushan in social work
People from Balrampur district
Rashtriya Swayamsevak Sangh pracharaks
Nominated members of the Rajya Sabha
Activists from Uttar Pradesh
20th-century Indian educational theorists
People from Hingoli district
India MPs 1977–1979
Bharatiya Janata Party politicians from Uttar Pradesh
Janata Party politicians
Lok Sabha members from Uttar Pradesh
Bharatiya Jana Sangh politicians
Indians imprisoned during the Emergency (India)
People from Marathwada
Social workers
Social workers from Uttar Pradesh
Recipients of the Bharat Ratna